Fougueux was a  74-gun French ship of the line built at Lorient from 1784 to 1785 by engineer Segondat.

Ship history
In 1796, she took part in the Expédition d'Irlande under Esprit-Tranquille Maistral.

She took part in the Battle of Trafalgar, firing the first shot of the battle upon . After badly damaging the Fougueux with broadsides, Temeraires first-lieutenant, Thomas Fortescue Kennedy, led a boarding party onto Fougueux, entering the French ship via her main deck ports and chains. The French tried to defend the decks port by port, but were steadily overwhelmed. Fougueuxs captain, Louis Alexis Baudoin, had suffered a fatal wound earlier in the fighting, leaving Commander François Bazin in charge. On learning that nearly all of the officers were dead or wounded and that most of the guns were out of action, Bazin surrendered the ship to Kennedy.

According to the report of Captain Lucas of the Redoutable,

On the day after the battle a severe storm battered the surviving ships. Fougueux was driven ashore near Torre Bermeja on the coast of Spain and was wrecked. Only 25 men aboard, British prize crew and French prisoners, survived.

See also
List of ships captured in the 19th century
List of ships of the line of France

Citations

References

External links 
 
 The Redoutable at Trafalgar

Ships of the line of the French Navy
Shipwrecks in the Atlantic Ocean
Shipwrecks of Spain
Téméraire-class ships of the line
Ships built in France
1785 ships
Maritime incidents in 1805
Captured ships
Napoleonic-era ships